Team dressage equestrian at the 2006 Asian Games was held in Equestrian Dressage Arena, Doha, Qatar on December 4, 2006. The event consisted of one round, Young Riders (YR) team test.

Schedule
All times are Arabia Standard Time (UTC+03:00)

Results

References
Results
Results at FEI

External links
Official website

Team dressage